The Rose Hotel is an album by American folk music artist Robert Earl Keen. It was released on September 29, 2009 by Lost Highway Records. The album peaked at number 17 on the Billboard Top Country Albums chart.

Track listing
All songs written by Robert Earl Keen except where noted.
"The Rose Hotel" – 3:47
"Flyin' Shoes" (Townes Van Zandt) – 4:00
"Throwin' Rocks" – 5:49
"10,000 Chinese Walk Into a Bar" – 4:17
"Something I Do" – 4:17
"The Man Behind the Drums" (Keen, Bill Whitbeck) – 4:00
"Goodbye Cleveland" (Keen, Whitbeck) – 4:29
"Laughing River" (Greg Brown) – 4:25
"On and On" – 4:37
"Village Inn" – 3:51
"Wireless in Heaven" – 4:34

Chart performance

References

2009 albums
Robert Earl Keen albums
Lost Highway Records albums